VGS may refer to:

Education
Videregående skole, upper secondary school in Norway

Gaming
 Voice Game System, a communication tool used in many team based online-multiplayer games
 Connectix Virtual Game Station, a PlayStation emulator.

Military
 Escort Scouting Squadron, a U.S. Navy aviation unit designation used from 1942 to 1943
 Volunteer Gliding Squadron

Music
 Voodoo Glow Skulls, skacore band

Places
 Arcot, Tamil Nadu, India
 Vince Genna Stadium, a baseball park in Bend, Oregon, US

Symbols
 VGS means gate to source voltage in field effect transistors (electronics)

Trade unions
 Union of Municipal and State Workers, former trade union in Germany